Varkurak (also Romanized as Varkūrak) is a village in Howmeh-ye Sarpol Rural District, in the Central District of Sarpol-e Zahab County, Kermanshah Province, Iran. At the 2006 census, its population was 69, in 16 families.

References 

Populated places in Sarpol-e Zahab County